The Indian Chief is a motorcycle that was built by the Hendee Manufacturing Company and the subsequent Indian  Company from 1922 to the end of the company's production in 1953, and again from 1999 to present.The Chief was Indian's "big twin", a larger, more powerful motorcycle than the more agile Scout used in competition and sport riding.

When Indian resumed civilian production after World War II, they revived only the Chief line. Production of Indian motorcycles ended with the last Chief made in 1953, then resumed again in 1999.

Origin

The Chief was introduced for 1922 to replace the Powerplus, although the Powerplus was continued under the "Standard" name until 1923. Designed by Charles B. Franklin, the Chief had design features similar to Franklin's earlier Scout, including the gearbox bolted to the engine casings and primary drive by gear train. Unlike the Powerplus/Standard, the Chief was not offered with rear suspension.

The Big Chief was introduced for 1923. The Big Chief had mainly been offered for sidecar use, but was popular with solo riders as well. The smaller-engined Chief was discontinued in 1928, partly to accommodate increased production of the Model 101 Scout.

Development
For 1940, the Chief frame was modified to include plunger rear suspension. In the same year, all Indian models were restyled with large, decorative fenders.

The Indian 340-B was a military motorcycle based on the Chief. The 340-B had open fenders and was usually supplied with a sidecar. Customers included the US. military, which received about 3,000, and France, which received 5,000 before it surrendered to Germany in 1940.

Post-war

After World War II, the Chief was the only pre-war Indian model to be manufactured. The leaf-sprung trailing-link fork used before the war was replaced by girder forks similar to those used by the military 841 and the Sport Scout.

No Chiefs were made for 1949. Production of the Chief ended in 1953, upon which Indian ceased production of motorcycles.

Later Chiefs

Brockhouse
In 1959, Brockhouse Engineering, owners of the Indian trademarks and distribution network, sold a rebadged Royal Enfield Meteor as an Indian Chief.

1999-2013

The Indian Motorcycle Company of America (IMCA) manufactured Indian Chief motorcycles in Gilroy, California, from 1999 to 2003. These initially used clones of Harley-Davidson Evolution engines built from S&S parts. Later versions used the in-house "Powerplus" engine.

A new company began production of Indian Chiefs in 2006 in King's Mountain, North Carolina. These were updated versions of the IMCA Chief. Production of the Chief was moved to Spirit Lake, Iowa, after Polaris Industries bought the company.

2014-present
In 2014, Indian released a new Indian Chief motorcycle with a new engine.  Nothing on the 2014 Chief is based on the earlier Chief bought from the King's Mountain company.

Notes

References

Vehicles introduced in 1922
Cruiser motorcycles
Chief
Motorcycles introduced in the 1920s